Spring Creek is a stream in Maries and Phelps counties of Missouri. It is a tributary of Gasconade River.

The stream headwaters arise in Phelps County just northeast of Rolla near the Missouri Route V interchange on I-44 (at ) and stream flows to the north-northwest passing under Missouri Route 63 about three miles north of Rolla. The stream enters Maries County near its midpoint, crosses under Missouri Route A and flows parallel to and just south of Route 63 again to its confluence with the Gasconade (at ) about four miles southeast of Vienna.

Spring Creek was named for the fact there are abundant springs along its course.

See also
List of rivers of Missouri

References

Rivers of Maries County, Missouri
Rivers of Phelps County, Missouri
Rivers of Missouri
Tributaries of the Gasconade River